Akhatov (masculine) or Akhatova (feminine) is a Russian surname. Notable people with the surname include:
 Albina Akhatova (born 1976), Russian biathlete
 Aydar Akhatov (born 1957), Russian journalist, scientist, economist and ecologist
 Gabdulkhay Akhatov (1927–1986), Russian Soviet linguist

Russian-language surnames
Tatar-language surnames